Ski Trails is a 1956 album by Jo Stafford, with accompaniment by Paul Weston and His Orchestra, The Starlighters, and the Norman Luboff Choir. Most of its songs have a winter theme.

Originally released on Columbia Records, the album was reissued in the 1970s on Stafford and Weston's Corinthian Records label.

Track listing 

 "Baby, It's Cold Outside"       
 "Moonlight in Vermont"
 "Let It Snow! Let It Snow! Let It Snow!"      
 "By the Fireside"
 "Hanover Winter Song" 
 Corinthian reissue substitutes "Winter Weather", originally from Stafford's Happy Holiday album
 "It Happened in Sun Valley"      
 "I've Got My Love to Keep Me Warm"     
 "The Nearness of You"       
 "Winter Wonderland"
 "June in January"       
 "The Whiffenpoof Song"   
 "Sleigh Ride"

References

1956 albums
Jo Stafford albums
Columbia Records albums
Corinthian Records albums
Concept albums
Albums conducted by Paul Weston